State Highway 214 (SH 214) is a Texas state highway that runs from Adrian to Seminole.

History
The route was originally designated on January 18, 1935, from Muleshoe to the Bailey County Line. On July 15, 1935, SH 214 was cancelled. SH 214 was restored on May 18, 1937, and extended south to Morton on May 24, 1938. SH 214 was extended to Plains on December 1, 1938. SH 214 was extended north to Friona on December 21, 1938. SH 214 was extended to Seminole on April 1, 1939. On March 27, 1940, The section from Friona south to Muleshoe was removed. On August 27, 1940, the section of SH 214 through Yoakum County was cancelled, creating a gap. On December 19, 1940, the section from Plains south to the Yoakum–Gaines County Line was added back. On May 29, 1941, the section from the Yoakum–Cochran County Line to Plains was added back. On December 13, 1956, an extension of SH 214 to Adrian along FM 299 to Friona, and FM 1412 and FM 290 to Adrian was signed, but not designated. On June 10, 1966, the extension to Friona was officially designated, replacing FM 299. On January 30, 1976, SH 214 was rerouted in Friona with the old route transferred to FM Spur 2397 and Spur 270 (now SH 214 Business). On August 29, 1990, the extension to Adrian was officially designated, replacing part of FM 1412 and all of FM 290.

Major intersections

References

214
Transportation in Gaines County, Texas
Transportation in Yoakum County, Texas
Transportation in Cochran County, Texas
Transportation in Bailey County, Texas
Transportation in Parmer County, Texas
Transportation in Deaf Smith County, Texas
Transportation in Oldham County, Texas